A horse length, or simply length, is a unit of measurement for the length of a horse from nose to tail, approximately .

Use in horse racing
The length is commonly used in Thoroughbred horse racing, where it describes the distance between horses in a race. Horses may be described as winning by several lengths, as in the notable example of Secretariat, who won the 1973 Belmont Stakes by 31 lengths. In 2013, the New York Racing Association placed a blue-and-white checkered pole at Belmont Park to mark that winning margin; using Equibase's official measurement of a length——the pole was placed  from the finish line.

More often, winning distances are merely a fraction of a length, such as half a length. In British horse racing, the distances between horses are calculated by converting the time between them into lengths by a scale of lengths-per-second. The actual number of lengths-per-second varies according to the type of race and the going conditions. For example, in a flat turf race run on good going, a value of six lengths-per-second is used; in a national hunt race on heavy going, where horses are assumed to be moving more slowly, the value is four lengths-per-second.

Other measures
Distances smaller than that are similarly described in reference to the equine body with terms such as a "neck", and a "head", a "short head" or "nose", the smallest possible named advantage by which a horse can win. In Ireland a margin of more than 30 lengths is described as a "distance". In the United Kingdom, the maximum recognised distance is 99 lengths, with anything over this being referred to as "99+ lengths". In France the term "short neck" is used for a margin intermediate between a head and a neck. Harness race finishing margins are typically measured in meters.

Other uses
These terms are used in other disciplines of equestrianism as well. It is particularly useful as a guide for riders in spacing animals apart when a number of them are all together in a riding arena such as during group riding instruction or at a horse show.

Abbreviations
In reporting result of horse races winning margins are commonly abbreviated:

See also
Glossary of equestrian terms
Glossary of Australian and New Zealand punting (horse-racing terms)
 List of unusual units of measurement
Glossary of North American horse racing

References

Horse racing terminology
Units of length